Murrabit West is a locality situated in Victoria, Australia. At the 2016 census, Keely had a population of 45.

References

Towns in Victoria (Australia)